Louise Borgia (17 May 1500 – 1553) was a French noblewoman. She was the daughter of Cesare Borgia, Duke of Valentinois, who died when she was almost seven years old. She was also Dame de Chalus, a title she inherited from her mother Charlotte of Albret. She was a member of the Third Order of Saint Dominic.

Life 
Louise was born on 17 May 1500. She was Cesare Borgia's only child with his wife, Charlotte of Albret. Her paternal grandparents were Pope Alexander VI of the House of Borgia and Vannozza dei Cattanei, and her maternal grandparents were Alain I of Albret, Lord of Albret, and Françoise of Châtillon-Limoges. She had at least eleven illegitimate half-siblings from her father's relationships with other women. 

On 12 March 1507, her father was killed at the siege of Viana in the service of her maternal uncle, King John III of Navarre. Her mother was her guardian until her death on 11 March 1514 when Louise was not quite fourteen years old. Louise then succeeded her mother as Dame de Chalus.

Louise married her first husband on 7 April 1517. He was Louis II de la Trémoille, Governor of Burgundy. He was killed at the Battle of Pavia on 24 February 1525, leaving her a widow at the age of 24. 

She married her second husband, Philippe de Bourbon, Seigneur de Bourbon-Busset on 3 February 1530. They made their home at the Château de Busset, where she made many renovations including a covered arcade on the ground floor and a gallery in the east wing. Together Philippe and Louise had six children.

Louise died on an unknown date in 1553.

Issue
 Claude de Bourbon, Count of Busset, of Puyagut, and of Chalus (18 October 1531- c.1588), married Marguerite de La Rochefoucauld, by whom he had issue.
 Marguerite de Bourbon (10 October 1532–8 September 1591), married Jean de Pierre-Buffiere, Baron of Pontarion. The marriage was childless.
 Henri de Bourbon (1533–1534)
 Catherine de Bourbon (born 14 October 1534)
 Jean de Bourbon, Seigneur of La Motte-Feuilly and de Montet (born 2 September 1537), married Euchariste de La Brosse-Morlet, by whom he had issue.
 Jerome de Bourbon, Seigneur de Montet (19 October 1543- before 1619), married Jeanne de Rollat. The marriage was childless.

References

Sources
150

1500 births
1553 deaths
Louise
Valentinois, Duchess of, Louise Borgia
Valentinois
Dukes of Valentinois
16th-century women rulers
Diario Borja-Borgia